Acción Ecológica is one of the main environmental organizations in Ecuador. It is based in Quito.

It campaigns on a range of issues including oil extraction, exploration and pipeline transport, Amazon rainforest protection, food sovereignty, biofuels and plantations for carbon offsets.

External links
 

Environmental organisations based in Ecuador